Christopher John McBride (born 26 June 1999) is a Scottish cricketer. In June 2019, he was selected to represent Scotland A in their tour to Ireland to play the Ireland Wolves. He made his List A debut for Scotland A against the Ireland Wolves on 6 June 2019. He made his Twenty20 debut for Scotland A against the Ireland Wolves on 9 June 2019.

In March 2022, he was named in Scotland's One Day International (ODI) squad for the 2022 Papua New Guinea Tri-Nation Series tournament. He made his ODI debut on 15 April 2022, for Scotland against Oman.

References

External links
 

1999 births
Living people
Scottish cricketers
Scotland One Day International cricketers
Sportspeople from Dumfries
Oxford MCCU cricketers